Peintre de la Marine (Painter of the Fleet) is a title awarded by the minister of defence in France to artists who have devoted their talents to the sea, the French Navy and other maritime subjects. It was set up in 1830 by the July Monarchy and can be awarded to painters, photographers, illustrators, engravers, and sculptors.

Rights and privileges 

The title is unpaid but does grant certain facilities and privileges:
being able to embark on French Navy vessels
wearing a uniform
being allowed to follow one's artistic signature with an anchor
belonging to the Service historique de la Marine.

The peintres agréés are named for a 3-year term by a jury of naval officers and peintres titulaires and presided over by a general officer of the Navy. To become a peintre titulaire, one has to serve as a peintre agréé for more than 4 consecutive terms (12 years).

History

Peintres de la Marine since 1830 (by date of appointment)

1830-1899 
 1830 : Louis-Philippe Crépin, Jean Antoine Théodore de Gudin,
 1849 : Eugène Lepoittevin
 1854 : Léon Morel-Fatio,
 1867 : P. de Crisenoy,
 1875 : C. Longueville,
 1876 : F. Roux,
 1880 : F.-P. Barry,
 1882 : L. Le Pic, P. Gaillard, Lepinay,
 1883 : M. Willenich, Pompon,
 1885 : Gaston. Roullet, E. Adam,
 1886 : T. Weber,
 1887 : G. Bourgain,
 1888 : M. N. Saulnier de La Pinelais,
 1889 : Eugène Dauphin,
 1890 : Léon Couturier, G. Le Sénéchal de Kerdreoret, A. Marcottes de Quivières, O. de Champeaux, La Boulaye, E. d'Argence,
 1891 : E. Maillart, L. Dumoulin, Eugène Chigot, P. Jobert, P. Bertrand,
 1892 : Moisson,
 1893 : T. Poilpot,
 1895 : P. Marsac, P. Liot,
 1896 : C. Bellenger, G. Ravanne,
 1898 : G. Vient, A. Johanson,
 1899 : François Charles Cachoud, E. Noirot, M. Perret,
 1900 : G. Galland, F. Legout-Gérard, P. Merwart, R. de Villars.

1901-1950 
 1901 : M. Roy - Félix Ziem,
 1902 : P.-H. Simons,
 1903 : F. Regamey,
 1904 : G.-H Aubain, P. Place-Canton, A. Berthon,
 1905 : Gustave Fraipont, L. E. de Jarny, M. Noire, F. Olivier, F. Guey,
 1906 : P. La Gatier, A. Sébille,
 1908 : E. Berthélémy, E. Chevalier, A. Delaistre, Charles Fouqueray,
 1909 : R. Dumont-Duparc,
 1910 : A. Chanteau, G. Chanteau, F.-H. Gauthier, L. P. Félix, H. Farre, Eugène François Deshayes,
 1911 : L. Laurent-Gsell, A. Moreaux,
 1912 : L.-E. Dauphin, F. Salkin,
 1914 : A. Nivard, C. Cazes,
 1915 : Paul Signac,
 1916 : M. Maufra, L. Jonas, R. Desouches,
 1917 : G. Taboureau, dit Sandy Hook,
 1918 : A. Roux-Renard, L. Haffner, J. Lancelin, Gabriel-Hippolyte Lebas,
 1919 : A. Matisse,
 1921 : Charles Millot alias H. Gervèse, G. Arnoux, Pierre Bodard, L. Bonamici, E.-L. Gillot, P. Morchain, R. Pinard, H.-E. Callot, P.-E. Lecomte, Mathurin Méheut, Frédéric Montenard,
 1922 : André Dauchez, B. Lachèvre, F. Lantoine, C. Martin-Sauvaigo, J.-L. Paguenaud,
 1923 : Llano Florez, G. F. Roussel, Du Gardier,
 1924 : E. Barbaroux, J. R. Carrière, Paul Levéré, M. Moisset, R. Quillivic, G. Rollin de Vertury, Jean Roque, A. Theunissen, P. Leconte,
 1925 : L. Madrassi, Vitalis Morin, G. Cochet, G. Drageon,
 1926 : G. Alaux, J. B. Roubaux,
 1927 : J. Gaboriaux,
 1928 : A. Silice, A. Gaussen, M. Gaussen,
 1929 : M. Guyot, dit Guy Loe,
 1930 : F. Alaux,
 1931 : V.-L. Delpy,
 1933 : J.-G. Daragnes, B. Roy, P. Roy, L. Simon, M. Vilalta,
 1934 : E. Blandin,
 1935 : Durand Coupel de Saint Front, dit Marin-Marie,
 1936 : Albert Brenet, F. Pascal, M. Menardeau, P. Bertrand, L. Dalloz, P. Bompard, Roger Chapelet, René-Yves Creston, Jim Sévellec, A. Verdihlan, J. Lacombe,
 1938 : J. Maxence,
 1940 : A. Goichon,
 1942 : E. Berthier de Sauvigny, J. Bouchaud, H. Cahours, H. Cristol, G. Guiraud, M. Laurent, Pierre Péron,
 1943 : Lucien Martial, P. Perraudin,
 1944 : L.-M. Bayle, Fernand Herbo, P. Noël,
 1945 : E. Ceria, J. Helleu, A. Lemoineau, A. Marquet, L. Pascal,
 1947 : H. F. Baille, V. Barbey, F. Decaix, A. Bizette-Lindet, G. Fouille, Henri de Waroquier,
 1948 : P. Dauchez, Charles Lapicque.

1950-99 
 1952 : C. Cerny, F. Desnoyers, Jean Even, André Hambourg,
 1955 : R. Bezombes,
 1956 : J. Delpech, Jean Rigaud,
 1957 : Louis Chervin,
 1959 : Jacques Boullaire, L. Gambier,
 1960 : M. Douguet,
 1962 : Albert Decaris,
 1963 : G. Hervigo,
 1973 : François Baboulet, M. Depré, Michel King, Jacques Bouyssou, Henri Plisson, Gaston Sébire, R. Yan,
 1975 : Jean-Pierre Alaux, François Bellec, Jean Dieuzaide, J. Courboules,
 1977 : Michel Hertz, Jean-Jacques Morvan,
 1979 : Jean Le Merdy, J. Peltier, Roger Montane,
 1981 : Arnaud d'Hauterives, Marc Monkowicki, Claude Schürr,
 1983 : André Bourrié, Jean-Marie Chourgnoz, Serge Marko,
 1987 : Michel Bernard, Michel Bez, R. Savary,
 1989 : J. Cluseau Lanauve, Jean-Gabriel Montador, Michel Tesmoingt, Jean-Paul Tourbatez,
 1991 : Marc-Pierre Berthier, Michel Jouenne, Philip Plisson, Stéphane Ruais,
 1993 : Paul Ambille, Pierre Courtois, F. Perhirin,
 1995 : Jacques Coquillay, Christiane Rosset,
 1997 : Claude Fauchère, Christoff Debusschere, Jean-Pierre Le Bras, Alain Bailhache,
 1999 : Roland Lefranc.

21st century 

 2001 : Patrick Camus, John Pendray, Ronan Olier
 2003 : Michèle Battut (painter), Michel Bellion, Titouan Lamazou, Christian Le Corre, Richard Texier, Jean-Marie Zacchi
 2005 : Yann Arthus-Bertrand (photographer), Éric Bari, Jean Lemonnier (sculptor), Anne Smith, Dirk Verdoorn,
 2008 : Jean Gaumy, Nicolas Vial.
 2010 : Marie Détrée-Hourrière, Jacques Rohaut, Olivier Dufaure de Lajarte, Guy L'Hostis
 2012 : Sylvie Du Plessis, Jean-Pierre Arcile, Yong-Man Kwon
 2015 : François Legrand, Jacques Perrin
 2018 : Olivier Desvaux, Alain Jamet, Hélène Legrand, Bertrand de Miollis, Thierry des Ouches
 2021 : Emmanuel Lepage, Raphaele Goineau, Jonathan Florent, Ewan Lebourdais

Sources

External links 
 Site officiel des Peintres de la Marine
peintres officiels de la marine
 Net-Marine Associations sur la Marine Nationale
 Musée National de la Marine

French Navy
Marine art